Aşağı Bradi (also, Ashagy Burady and Borady) is a village in the Lerik Rayon of Azerbaijan.

References 

Populated places in Lerik District